The Vetrino–Isaccea–Yuzhnoukrainsk powerline is the third 750 kilovolts powerline running from Ukraine to the European Union.

History
Construction of a 750 kV powerline from Ukraine through Romania to Bulgaria was agreed on together with construction of the South Ukraine Nuclear Power Plant. The agreement was signed in Moscow in 1982 by the electrical industry ministers of the Soviet Union, Romania and Bulgaria. The powerline started operating in 1986 and it was completed in 1988.

Route
The powerline starts in Bulgaria at Vetrino (Suvorovo) substation near Varna and runs northward. In Dobrudja it crosses the border between Romania and Bulgaria and terminates at Isaccea substation in Romania. From there the line crosses Danube River, which forms the border between Ukraine and Romania in a 938 metres long span on two 118 metres tall delta pylons situated east of Isaccea and runs than to Yuzhnoukrainsk substation situated just north of South Ukraine Nuclear Power Plant.

Hereby it crosses at least four times the border between Moldova and Ukraine. However, there is and was no branch to the power grid in Moldova, although it passes Vulcăneşti substation.

Description 
The used towers are designed for carrying a single circuit in a single level. As conductors bundle conductors of 4 ropes are used. Nearly all suspension towers are portal pylons, most of them guyed, but also several free-standing. The free-standing portal pylons carry the conductor in the middle on a V-shaped insulator, while the outermost conductors are as at the guyed suspension towers carried by a normal suspension insulator. As strainers triple towers are used whereby a fourth tower is required for strainers without or with less direction change for keeping the required distance of the outmost conductor to the tower. Also transposing towers are implemented as monopolar towers whereby two additional towers are required.

Current state 
The section between Vetrino and Isaccea is since the synchronisation of the Romanian power grid with that of Western Europe, which took after 6 years of trial operation finally take place in 2003 , operated with 400 kV.
The section between Isaccea and Yuzhnoukrainsk is since the synchronisation of the Romanian power grid with that of Western Europe not in use and scrapped in most parts.

Sites

Waypoints Vetrino-Isaccea

Waypoints Isaccea–Yuzhnoukrainsk

See also

 Albertirsa–Zakhidnoukrainska–Vinnytsia powerline
 Rzeszów–Khmelnytskyi powerline

External links
 Picture of demolished pylon
 https://web.archive.org/web/20071119014744/http://www.eco.md/article/4337/
 https://www.panoramio.com/photo/55787410

References

Energy infrastructure completed in 1988
Electric power infrastructure in Bulgaria
Electric power infrastructure in Romania
Electric power transmission systems in Ukraine
High-voltage transmission lines
Ruins in Moldova
Ruins in Ukraine
1988 establishments in Europe